Fed Through the Teeth Machine is the fourth studio album by the American band The Red Chord, released October 27, 2009. The album was self-produced by the band and was mixed and mastered by Chris "Zeuss" Harris. Fed Through the Teeth Machine sold more than 2,700 copies in the United States in its first week of release and debuted at No. 180 on the Billboard 200 chart.

Background 
Kozowyk explained the album title: "It's from the Discovery Channel show How It's Made. They were talking about this machine they feed zippers through, but we just thought the name was creepy."

Guitarist Mike "Gunface" McKenzie commented: "We spent the last year working hard on this one and we're excited for everyone to finally hear it. It's a lot faster and, in my opinion, more straight-forward in a structural sense. We're really happy with the great work Jonny Fay and Zeuss did, too. It's not a concept record, but there are some loose conceptual elements to it: hygienic obsession, delusional compound-dwellers and Maniac Mansion."

Fed Through the Teeth Machine sold around 2,700 copies in the United States in its first week of release and debuted at No. 180 on the Billboard 200 chart. The Red Chord also debuted at No. 34 on the Billboard Hard Music chart and No. 6 on the Billboard Heatseeker chart. Fed Through the Teeth Machine cracked the Neilson Sound Scan charts in Canada coming in at No. 57 on the Independent charts and No. 70 on the Hard charts.

Reception 

Revolver stated about the album: "The foursome's fierce attack is as brutal as ever...what could well be a bunch of noise in the hands of lesser headbangers is intricate and engrossing on Teeth Machine, whether it's the twisting tempo shifts of 'Demoralizer' or the blazing twin guitar attacks on 'Hymns and Crippled Anthems'."

Decibel commented the album: "...there's a definite stamp of intent on Fed Through the Teeth Machine; there are more dynamics, more variety, a wider swath of sound being used in conjunction with the band's brand of grind/death/core. Opener 'Demoralizer' is an excellent grinder with solid rhythms and a smooth integration of breathy string bends that are almost psychedelic. The next track, 'Hour of Rats', utilizes a unique scalar shuffle with equal amounts melody and crunch. There are moments when Fed Through is angrier than a hornet's nest, faster than Usain Bolt with diarrhea, and weird as that guy talking to himself on the street corner, but still as smart as a college professor and groovier than the skin around grandma's eyes."

The Daily News McKeesport stated: "Massachusetts' tech-death/hardcore muck and grinders The Red Chord developed the template for their sound, only to watch a million other bands copy it. Big surprise, huh? Well, the joke's on the newcomers, because The Red Chord still do it far better, which they prove beyond a shadow of doubt on their fourth album."

CraveOnline stated that "Fed Through the Teeth Machine is a capable and well-executed grindcore record from a band that understands what the genre is all about."

Track listing

Personnel 

The Red Chord
 Guy Kozowyk – lead vocals
 Mike "Gunface" McKenzie – guitar, backing vocals
 Greg Weeks – bass guitar
 Brad Fickeisen – drums

Featurettes
 Vincent Bennett (of The Acacia Strain) – additional vocals on "Face Area Solution"

Production
 The Red Chord – production
 Jonny Fay – recording engineer
 Chris "Zeuss" Harris – mixing and mastering
 Michael J. Windsor – album artwork

References

External links 
Recording sessions (video)
 Studio Update #1 – Drums, metalinjection.net
 Studio Update #2 – Drum Edits, metalinjection.net
 Studio Update #3 – Guitars, metalinjection.net
 Studio Update #4 – Bass Recording, metalinjection.net

2009 albums
The Red Chord albums
Metal Blade Records albums